Akbar Khamiso Khan ( ، ) is an alghoza player from the Sindh province of Pakistan.

Early life
Khan was born on August 10, 1976 in Hyderabad, Hyderabad District, Sindh, Pakistan. His father was renowned alghoza player Khamiso Khan.

Career
Khan has performed both domestically and internationally. One of his most notable performances was at the Golden Jubilee Celebrations of OIC in Saudi Arabia. He plays tunes from all the provinces of Pakistan.

Awards
Khan won the Pride of Performance prize in 2010.

References

Pakistani artists
Pakistani folk music
Recipients of the Pride of Performance
1967 births
Living people